Gustavo Kuerten defeated Patrick Rafter in the final, 6–1, 6–3 to win the singles tennis title at the 2001 Cincinnati Masters.

Thomas Enqvist was the defending champion, but lost in the first round to Nicolas Kiefer.

Seeds

  Gustavo Kuerten (champion)
  Andre Agassi (first round)
  Marat Safin (first round)
  Juan Carlos Ferrero (second round)
  Lleyton Hewitt (semifinals)
  Yevgeny Kafelnikov (quarterfinals)
  Tim Henman (semifinals)
  Patrick Rafter (final)
  Pete Sampras (second round)
  Arnaud Clément (second round)
  Thomas Enqvist (first round)
  Thomas Johansson (first round)
  Carlos Moyá (second round)
  Goran Ivanišević (third round)
  Wayne Ferreira (first round)
  Dominik Hrbatý (first round)

Draw

Finals

Top half

Section 1

Section 2

Bottom half

Section 3

Section 4

External links
 2001 Cincinnati Masters draw

2001 Cincinnati Masters
Singles